Ibn Firnas is a lunar impact crater on the far side of the Moon. In 1976 it was named after Abbas Ibn Firnas, a polymath from Andalucia who, in the 9th century, devised a chain of rings that could be used to simulate the motions of the planets and stars.

Attached to the exterior of its southwestern rim is the prominent crater King. Only a few kilometers to the north, separated by a rugged stretch of terrain, is the larger crater Ostwald. This is a worn and eroded crater with small impacts along the northern and eastern rims. The satellite crater Ibn Firnas L lies along the inner wall to the southeast and covers part of the interior floor. Along the northern side, the small satellite crater Ibn Firnas Y cuts through the rim and overlays part of the inner wall. The interior floor is irregular along the northern and southwest sections where their shape has been modified by the large nearby craters mentioned above. Several small craterlets lie across the remainder of the interior floor.

Prior to 1976, this crater was known as Crater 213.

Nearby craters
Several small craters located in the rugged terrain at the northern edge of this crater have been assigned names by the IAU. These are listed in the table below.

The crater Melissa lies across the north-northwestern outer rim of Ibn Firnas. It is a roughly bowl-shaped, although it has a very uneven appearance due to the irregular terrain in which it was formed. Melissa was previously designated Ibn Firnas Y before it was assigned a name by the IAU.

The locations of these craters are shown on the following L&PI topographic maps:
 LTO-65B4 Recht
 LTO-65C1 King

Satellite craters
By convention these features are identified on lunar maps by placing the letter on the side of the crater midpoint that is closest to Ibn Firnas.

References

External links

 LTO65C1 King Lunar Topographic Orthophotomap, 1974 

Impact craters on the Moon